Love Forecast (lit. Today's Love) is a 2015 South Korean romantic comedy film co-written and directed by Park Jin-pyo. Starring Lee Seung-gi and Moon Chae-won, the film depicts the relationship between men and women as being as delicate and complex as the weather.

Synopsis
Weather reporter Kim Hyun-woo (Moon Chae-won) is known for her beauty and elegance on television, but off-screen, she drinks and swears a lot. Hyun-woo has been friends for 18 years with Kang Joon-soo (Lee Seung-gi), a mild-mannered elementary school teacher who gives too much of himself in his relationships but always ends up getting dumped. Joon-soo has secretly loved Hyun-woo for years, but she claims she doesn't feel any sexual attraction between them, and he's had to stand by and watch while she fawns over married colleague Lee Dong-jin (Lee Seo-jin) and goes on a blind date with nice but boring photographer Yeom Hyo-bong(Jung Joon-young). Fate turns out that the childhood friends are destined together.

Cast

 Lee Seung-gi as Kang Joon-soo
 Moon Chae-won as Kim Hyun-woo
 Hong Hwa-ri as young Hyun-woo
 Lee Seo-jin as Lee Dong-jin
 Jung Joon-young as Yeom Hyo-bong/Andrew
 Go Yoon as Jae-joong
 Lizzy as Min-ah
 Ryu Hwayoung as Hee-jin
 Park Si-eun as Joon-hee
 Ha Kyeong-min as Han Seong-gu
 Park Eun-ji as Cha Myung-sun
 Nam Neung-mi as Bath house granny 
 Hong Seong-heun as Man at amusement park
 Song Young-chang as Headquarters director 
 Im Jong-yoon as General manager

Cameo appearance
 Im Ha-ryong as Principal
 Kim Kap-soo as Joon-soo's father 
 Lee Kyung-jin as Joon-soo's mother 
 Kim Bu-seon as Hyun-woo's mother 
 Kim Kwang-kyu as Man in Hongdae without an office 
 Hong Seok-cheon as My Thai China restaurant owner 
 Kim So-yeon as Joon-soo's ex-girlfriend 1 
 Son Ga-in as Joon-soo's ex-girlfriend 2

Production
This was Lee Seung-gi's film debut, and his onscreen reunion with Moon Chae-won after the television series Brilliant Legacy in 2009.

Love Forecast began filming in July 2014, and the shoot wrapped on November 9, 2014.

Box office
Love Forecast was released on January 15, 2015. It opened at second place on the South Korean box office, grossing  from 972,000 admissions in its first five days. As of February 5, it has grossed  from 1,892,125 admissions.

References

External links
  
  
 
 
 

Films directed by Park Jin-pyo
South Korean romantic comedy films
2015 films
CJ Entertainment films
2015 romantic comedy films
2010s South Korean films
2010s Korean-language films